The 1973 NBA World Championship Series was the championship series of the 1972–73 National Basketball Association (NBA) season, and the culmination of that season's playoffs. The Eastern Conference champion New York Knicks defeated the Western Conference champion Los Angeles Lakers 4 games to 1. The series was an exact reversal of the prior year, with the Knicks winning Game 1 and the Lakers taking the next four games. Knicks center Willis Reed was named as the NBA Finals MVP.

Background

Los Angeles Lakers

The Los Angeles Lakers entered the 1973 NBA Playoffs as co-favorites in the West with the Milwaukee Bucks, but both teams faced inspired opponents in the first round. The Chicago Bulls gave the Lakers all they could handle before the Lakers came from behind in Game 7 to take the series. The Lakers next faced the Golden State Warriors for the Western Conference Championship (the Warriors had upset the Bucks in six games). In Game 1, the Lakers won by 2, and in Game 2 the Lakers won by 10. In Game 3 at Oakland, the Lakers routed the Warriors 126-70, but the Warriors won Game 4 to send the series back to Los Angeles. In the Forum, the Lakers took Game 5 and advanced to their fifth NBA Finals series in six seasons.

New York Knicks

One year after their NBA Finals loss, the Knicks were back in the playoffs. For some of the Knicks, including Jerry Lucas and Earl Monroe, this was probably their last shot at an NBA title. In the first round they paired against the Baltimore Bullets. The Knicks won Game's 1 and 2 in New York, but lost Game 3 at Baltimore (in that game, the Bullets used a strange lineup of two centers and three guards). New York would take Games 4 and 5 Walt Frazier averaging 20 points per game in this series. In the Conference Finals, the Knicks faced the 68-14 Boston Celtics, who not only had the league's best record but also, to that point, the third-best won-lost record in NBA history. The Celtics routed New York, 134-108, Game 1 at the Boston Garden, but the Knicks returned the favor with a 129-96 rout in Game 2 at Madison Square Garden.  The Knicks then beat the Celtics in Game 3 in Boston, and took a 3-1 series lead with a double overtime Easter Sunday win back in New York.  Boston came back with two critical wins, winning 98-97 in Boston on two Paul Silas free throws, then regaining the home-court advantage with a 110-100 win New York in Game 6.  For Game 7, however, the Celtics were without their star John Havlicek, who was nursing an elbow injury.   In that Game 7, played in Boston, the Celtics unbeaten record in seventh games played in Boston Garden was snapped when New York won easily, 94-78.

Road to the Finals

Series summary
After losing the first game, the Knicks reeled off four straight wins to reclaim the NBA title. This is the Knicks' most recent NBA Championship to date. New York would not make it back to the NBA Finals until 1994. 

This would also be the last Finals appearance of the decade for the Lakers. Their next appearance would be in 1980, which would be the first of nine Finals appearances in 12 years for the franchise.

Knicks win series 4-1

This was the only NBA Championship for Jerry Lucas and Earl Monroe.

Game 5 of the series was Wilt Chamberlain's last game played in the NBA. Chamberlain scored the last points of the game, and of his career, on an uncontested fast break dunk with one second remaining.

ABC televised its last NBA Finals, until 2003. This is, to date, the last time a New York/Los Angeles NBA Finals of any combination has taken place, as well as the fifth-to-last championship series contested by both cities in any sport (the 1981 World Series is the last matchup in the 20th century, and the 2014 Stanley Cup Finals is the latest).

Team rosters

New York Knicks

Los Angeles Lakers

See also
 1972–73 NBA season
 1973 NBA Playoffs

References

External links
 NBA History

National Basketball Association Finals
Finals
NBA
NBA
1970s in Los Angeles County, California
NBA Finals
Basketball competitions in New York City
Basketball competitions in Inglewood, California
NBA Finals
NBA Finals